Aaata is a genus of beetles belonging to the family Buprestidae, containing the single species Aaata finchi.

References

External links

Aaata finchi
An EOL search listing this genus, the two species of the sponge genus and a species of oak

Monotypic Buprestidae genera
Taxa named by Andrey Semyonov-Tyan-Shansky